James Kenny is a professional photographer based in the United Kingdom, best known for his fashion, celebrity portrait, and documentary work.

Biography 
Kenny was born and raised in Cambridgeshire, where he studied Photography and Journalism with the intention of becoming an automotive journalist.  The vast majority of Kenny's documentary work focuses on current affairs and children's issues.

One of Kenny's projects looked into the legacy of the Chernobyl disaster, where he photographed orphans in Gomel, Belarus affected by the radioactive pollution. Kenny visited the orphanages with nine bikers who were raising money for The Chernobyl Children's Project.

References

External links 
James Kenny's Website

Year of birth missing (living people)
Living people
Photographers from Cambridgeshire